Albano Olivetti and David Vega Hernández were the defending champions but only Olivetti chose to defend his title, partnering Dan Added. Olivetti successfully defended his title.

Added and Olivetti won the title after defeating Julian Cash and Constantin Frantzen 3–6, 6–1, [10–8] in the final.

Seeds

Draw

References

External links
 Main draw

Teréga Open Pau-Pyrénées - Doubles